Remo Vigni (11 November 1938 – 17 June 2019) was an Italian footballer who played for Brescia as a striker.

References

1938 births
2019 deaths
Italian footballers
Brescia Calcio players
Association football forwards
Footballers from Brescia